Yvan Darsigny (born 2 March 1966) is a Canadian former weightlifter. He competed at the 1984 Summer Olympics and the 1992 Summer Olympics.

His daughter, Tali Darsigny, is also a weightlifter. His son Shad Darsigny is also a weightlifter.

References

External links
 

1966 births
Living people
Canadian male weightlifters
Olympic weightlifters of Canada
Weightlifters at the 1984 Summer Olympics
Weightlifters at the 1992 Summer Olympics
Sportspeople from Quebec
Commonwealth Games medallists in weightlifting
Commonwealth Games bronze medallists for Canada
Weightlifters at the 1994 Commonwealth Games
20th-century Canadian people
21st-century Canadian people
Medallists at the 1994 Commonwealth Games